USS Reuben James (DE-153) was a  in the United States Navy.  She was the second ship named for Reuben James, a Boatswain's Mate who distinguished himself fighting the Barbary pirates.

Reuben James was laid down on 7 September 1942 at the Norfolk Naval Shipyard, Portsmouth, Virginia, launched on 6 February 1943, sponsored by Mrs. Oliver Hiram Ward, and commissioned on 1 April 1943.

Service history
First based in Miami, Florida, she conducted anti-submarine patrols and provided training in convoy escort and anti-submarine warfare. In March 1944, she shifted homeport from Miami to Norfolk, Virginia. In June 1944, she escorted a convoy from New York to Norfolk. Between 13 July and 7 November 1944, Reuben James successfully escorted two convoys to the Mediterranean, returning with westbound convoys. During the ship's first eastbound voyage, nine German bomber aircraft attacked its convoy off Algeria on 1 August 1944. Reuben James shot down one enemy bomber. Returning to Boston on 7 November 1944, she joined an anti-submarine group operation in the North Atlantic.

Arriving at Houston, Texas, on 4 July 1945, Reuben James completed conversion to a radar picket ship on 25 November 1945, and was subsequently employed in the Atlantic and the Caribbean while being stationed in Norfolk, Virginia.  She was decommissioned on 11 October 1947.

In 1949, she was designated DER, but was reclassified DE in 1954. She remained in the Atlantic Reserve Fleet until struck from the Navy List on 30 June 1968. Her hulk was sunk as a target on 1 March 1971.

References

External links
 

1943 ships
Buckley-class destroyer escorts
Ships built in Portsmouth, Virginia
Ships sunk as targets
World War II frigates and destroyer escorts of the United States
Maritime incidents in 1971